The Zamboanga del Sur Provincial Board is the Sangguniang Panlalawigan (provincial legislature) of the Philippine province of Zamboanga del Sur.

The members are elected via plurality-at-large voting: the province is divided into two districts, each having five seats. A voter votes up to five names, with the top five candidates per district being elected. The vice governor is the ex officio presiding officer, and only votes to break ties. The vice governor is elected via the plurality voting system province-wide.

The districts used in appropriation of members is coextensive with the legislative districts of Zamboanga del Sur.

Aside from the regular members, the board also includes the provincial federation presidents of the Liga ng mga Barangay (ABC, from its old name "Association of Barangay Captains"), the Sangguniang Kabataan (SK, youth councils) and the Philippine Councilors League (PCL).

Apportionment

List of members

Current members 
These are the members after the 2019 local elections and 2018 barangay and SK elections:

 Vice Governor: Roseller Ariosa (UNA)

Past members

Vice Governors

1st District Board Members

2nd District Board Members

References 

Politics of Zamboanga del Sur
Provincial boards in the Philippines